Carmel Busuttil  (born 29 February 1964), nicknamed "Il-Bużu", is a Maltese former professional footballer who played as a striker for Rabat Ajax.

Regarded as one of the best Maltese players of all time, he began his career with his hometown club Rabat Ajax winning two Premier League titles, two Super Cups and an FA Trophy. After a year spell with Verbania in Italy, Busuttil joined Genk in 1988. He was a prominent figure in the Belgian side, where he served as club captain and was the team's top scorer for three consecutive seasons. Busuttil returned to Malta to join Sliema Wanderers where he won another Premier League title. He finished off his career in 2001 as one of the highest goalscorers in Premier League history with 93 goals.

At international level, Busuttil made his debut for the Maltese national team in 1982. He was capped 113 times, scoring 23 goals in the process. He is the nation's fourth-most capped player of all-time, and his top goalscoring record stood until it was broken in March 2010. In 2004, he was selected by the Malta Football Association as the country's "single most outstanding player" in the last 50 years as part of the UEFA Jubilee Awards.

Club career

Rabat Ajax 

Born in Rabat, Malta, Busuttil was introduced to football when he played with the neighbourhood children next to his parents’ house. He joined Rabat Magpies Amateurs at the age of ten, and following financial and administrative problems a new club was formed under the name of Rabat Ajax. Spotted by former Malta international and head coach of Rabat Ajax, Lolly Borg, Busuttil made his debut at age 14 against Għaxaq. Starting from the Third Division, Rabat Ajax earned two successive promotions, making a  return to the top tier of Maltese football for the 1982–83 season after a 17-year wait. In their first season back, Rabat Ajax finished a respectable second place, tied with Valletta, which gave them access to the 1983–84 UEFA Cup. Busuttil made his debut in European competition in the 0–10 defeat against the Czechs of Inter Bratislava, played at the Rabat Ajax Football Ground on 11 September 1983.

After two runner-up finishes in their first two seasons back, in which Busuttil was awarded the first out of his two Player of the Year awards, Rabat Ajax won the Premier League title for two seasons in a row; the second was part of a double with the FA Trophy. The high point of the previous seasons was followed by the low of the 1986–87 season as Rabat Ajax surprisingly suffered relegation. Busuttil finished as the league top scorer with 10 goals.

Verbania 

Following Rabat's relegation, Busuttil expressed interest in leaving the club and Adelmo Paris, who at that time was with Żurrieq, invited him to join him at semi-professional Verbania. In late August 1987, a season-long loan deal was agreed, with an additional clause added that following the season, in the event that a higher-level Italian club showed interest in Busuttil, Verbania would act on behalf of Rabat Ajax and receive 30% of any deal struck. Playing in the Promozione, at that time the fifth level in Italian football, Verbania finished second in the Piemonte and Aosta Valley regional division, gaining promotion to the Interregionale (today's Serie D). Busuttil ended his first stint outside his home country with eight goals to his name, and nowadays is still regarded with high esteem at the Piedmontese side.

Genk 

During the summer of 1988, Belgian side Genk started negotiations with Rabat Ajax for Busuttil's signature. Rabat Ajax were hesitant to sanction the sale due to Busuttil's importance to the team and the lack of agreement on the transfer fee; in turn, Busuttil was suspended by the club for his stance on leaving the club and did not play for three months. Ultimately, the Malta Football Association (MFA) president (and future President of Malta) George Abela interceded on behalf of Rabat Ajax and in September 1988 an agreement was reached for the transfer of Busuttil. The sum agreed was Lm 45,000 (€104,821) and he joined the club after a 15-day trial.

His first season was also Genk's first as a newly-formed club following the merger of Waterschei Thor with KFC Winterslag. The club was marred with an unhealthy environment of bitterness between old rivals and now members of a single club, and finished the season last with only two wins in 34 matches. Busuttil scored the first of his three goals for the season in a 2–2 draw against Beerschot on 2 October 1988. Fortunes soon turned for the club and they finished fourth in the Second Division, thereby qualifying for the promotion play-offs. In the decisive match against Zwarte Leeuw, played on 31 May 1990, Busuttil scored twice as Genk won 7–2. He finished the season as the club's top scorer with 17 goals in all competitions, including 14 in the league.

Returning to the top division, Busuttil further solidified his place in the first team and extended his stay with the club despite interest from Belgian, Turkish and Hungarian clubs. For the following four years he served as club captain. Although considered relegation candidates for most of the 1990–91 season, Genk finished 14th in the league, avoiding relegation by four points; Busuttil scored five goals including the opener in a 1–1 draw against eventual champions Anderlecht on 13 April 1991. In the following couple of seasons, Busuttil finished as club top scorer with ten goals as Genk narrowly avoided relegation in both years. His last season with the Belgian club ended on a low point as the team's poor performances coupled with three managers hired during the course of the season led to a last place finish; Busuttil ended his season with six goals.

He finished his spell with Genk registering 57 goals in 183 games, becoming a crowd favourite and remaining highly regarded to this day.

Sliema Wanderers 

Busuttil returned to Malta and in the summer of 1994 signed with Sliema Wanderers for a reported sum of Lm40,000 (€93,175). In his first season back in his homeland he scored seven goals and helped Sliema Wanderers finish runners-up behind Hibernians. The following season, Hibernians and Valletta started as early title favourites. With inconsistent results between the two and a comeback win for Sliema Wanderers against Valletta in the second round, the Blues never looked back and headed to a league title win, the 23rd in their history. Although this was to be his only Premier League title with Sliema Wanderers, his contribution was not only limited to his goal-scoring capabilities (scoring 35 goals in 67 matches between the 1996 and 1999 league campaigns) but he also served as a player-coach for the 1997–98 season. In the 1999–2000 season, Busuttil added the FA Trophy and Super Cup to his honours, both triumphs coming against Birkirkara. The following season, Busuttil found his first European goal, scoring the winner in a 2–1 win over Partizan in the first leg of the qualifying round of the 2000–01 UEFA Cup.

His last league game of his career came on 18 August 2001 in the 4–1 win over Marsa, the opening game of the 2001–02 season. During this game he scored a goal but was also sent off, resulting in an unfulfilled one-match ban. Busuttil's last official match came the following week, in the second leg qualifier of the 2001–02 UEFA Cup, a 2–1 win over Matador Púchov in which he left a mark with his final goal.

International career 

Following his early exploits with Rabat Ajax, Busuttil made his debut for Malta on 5 June 1982 in a 2–1 win against Iceland in a UEFA Euro 1984 qualifying match played at the Stadio Giovanni Celeste. In his fifth cap with the senior side, Busuttil scored a brace in a 2–3 defeat against Spain played on 15 May 1983. His goals gave Malta a momentary 2–1 lead but were outdone by a late winner from Rafael Gordillo. On 15 December 1984, Malta hosted West Germany at the National Stadium in a 1986 FIFA World Cup qualifier. In a record crowd of 35,000, Busuttil gave Malta a ten-minute lead after avoiding the challenge from a German defender and scoring with a low shot to the left corner. Malta ultimately ended up losing 2–3, with Busuttil completing the second half carrying an injury following a first-half stamp from Hans-Peter Briegel where he had to be given a painkiller during half-time.

During the 1990 FIFA World Cup qualifiers, Malta played against Hungary in a home match on 11 December 1988. The Hungarians took a 1–0 lead before the break, but at the start of the second half, Busuttil scored the equaliser after receiving a through pass from Raymond Vella and rounding goalkeeper Péter Disztl. As Hungary regained their lead with a József Kiprich penalty, a minute into stoppage time Busuttil struck again from a Silvio Vella freekick to equalise the scores. In the reverse fixture played at the Népstadion on 12 April 1989, Malta took the lead after seven minutes: John Buttigieg won the ball inside his own penalty box and after beating the challenge of a number of Hungarian players, fed the ball to Busuttil who overcame Ervin Kovács and slid the ball past Disztl. The match ended in a 1–1 draw with Imre Boda scoring from the penalty spot.

On 19 December 1992, in a 1994 FIFA World Cup qualifier, Malta hosted Italy in a packed stadium. Following a first half with no goals, Italy scored twice in three minutes. After a penalty miss from Kristian Laferla following Franco Baresi's handball offence, five minutes from time, Malta reduced the lead when Busuttil collected a Charles Scerri through ball and fed Martin Gregory for the goal. This ended up to be a consolation goal as Malta were defeated 1–2.

Busuttil was named captain for the first time in the 0–3 defeat against Scotland on 17 February 1993, fulfilling this role for 36 games in his international career. On 16 February 1994, Malta faced Belgium for the first time on a senior level, the latter using this match as preparation for the 1994 FIFA World Cup finals. Busuttil, who at that time was plying his trade in Belgium and had arrived in the same aircraft as the Belgian party, collected a pass from Raymond Vella (this was also Vella's last match with the national side following his retirement) and scored what would be the match winner. Returning to Genk, Busuttil rode the same plane as the Belgian squad.

His 100th cap arrived on 6 February 2000 in the 3–0 win against Azerbaijan, the first Maltese national to achieve this feat. His final Malta appearance came on 25 April 2001 in a 1–4 defeat against Iceland, ending his international career amassing 113 games and 23 goals. His 23 goals were the highest scored with the international team up till 3 March 2010 when Michael Mifsud scored his 24th goal in a 1–2 defeat against Finland.

Retirement 

Following his retirement, in September 2001 Busuttil opened the Bużu Football School, a youth development initiative aimed at providing football coaching programs. He also ventured into the futsal game, playing for Konica Minolta Gunners which included in its roster a number of former Maltese international players like John Buttigieg, Silvio Vella, Ray Farrugia, and Martin Gregory. Alongside Buttigieg, Busuttil participated in a six-a-side competition played in October 2002 at the London Arena representing the Southern Europe team; the selection ended up winning the one-day competition and Busuttil was awarded with both the Goal and Player of the Tournament.

Busuttil took part in numerous local charity events, consisting of friendly-style football matches against teams made up of former professional players and one-off selections.

Managerial career 

On 21 October 2003, the Malta Football Association announced the appointment of Horst Heese as the new head coach of the Maltese national team, and Busuttil would serve as his assistant with the aim to take over in two years' time. Heese managed Busuttil during the latter's time playing with Malta's national team and was an important figure in pushing for Busuttil's transfer to Genk. At the end of 2005, Heese made aware his intentions of not extending his contract and the MFA began discussions with Busuttil to take the helm. When Busuttil rejected the association's offer, Dušan Fitzel was engaged on a two-year contract.

On 17 November 2005, Busuttil was presented as the new coach for Third Division side, Santa Luċija, signing a season-long contract. His first game in charge was a 2–1 win over Siġġiewi. Santa Luċija finished fifth in the league which wasn't enough for a promotion place to the Second Division. In November 2006, Pietà Hotspurs announced Busuttil as their new coach. At the time, Pietà Hotspurs were lingering at the bottom of the Premier League table with only two points from eight games, and although he had a slow start the team's form recovered and by the end of the season they confirmed their top-tier status with games to spare. The following 2007–08 season, Pietà Hotspurs ended their 12-year stay at the top level when they finished second to last and were relegated to the First Division.

In July 2009, Dušan Fitzel stepped down from his coaching role of the Maltese national team due to health problems and was replaced by John Buttigieg, with Busuttil returning as assistant, and both officially signed a five-year contract starting from 1 August. Following a two-year spell which gave only two wins from 21 games and with criticism over the players' selection, Buttigieg and Busuttil were relieved of their duties. Between August 2012 and June 2018, Busuttil formed part of Melita's coaching staff, assisting both the senior amateur team in their first-ever season in the Premier League as well as heading the youth academy.

Busuttil is a holder of the UEFA A Licence, and on 6 July 2011, he obtained his Category 1 UEFA Pro Coaching Licence at Coverciano.

Personal life 

Busuttil is married to Julie, who he met while playing for Rabat Ajax, and they have two children: Kelly and Gary (the latter named after English striker Gary Lineker).

Career statistics

Club

International

International goals 

"Score" represents the score in the match after Busuttil's goal.

Honours and achievements

Player 

Rabat Ajax
Premier League: 1984–85, 1985–86
FA Trophy: 1985–86
Super Cup: 1985, 1986

Sliema Wanderers
Premier League: 1995–96
FA Trophy: 1999–2000
Super Cup: 1996, 2000

Individual 

 Maltese Player of the Year: 1983, 1986
 Premier League Player of the Month: October 1985, March 1995, February 1997, October 1997, August 1998
 UEFA Jubilee Awards – Malta's Golden Player
 Malta Olympic Committee Hall of Fame

Orders 

 Midalja għall-Qadi tar-Repubblika: 2000

See also 
List of men's footballers with 100 or more international caps

References

External links 
 

1964 births
Living people
Maltese footballers
Malta international footballers
Association football forwards
Rabat Ajax F.C. players
S.S. Verbania Calcio players
K.R.C. Genk players
Sliema Wanderers F.C. players
Belgian Pro League players
Maltese Premier League players
FIFA Century Club
UEFA Golden Players
Expatriate footballers in Belgium
Expatriate footballers in Italy
Maltese expatriate sportspeople in Belgium
Maltese expatriate sportspeople in Italy
Maltese expatriate footballers
Maltese football managers
Maltese Premier League managers